The Bolivarian Navy of Venezuela, commonly known as the Venezuelan Navy, is the naval branch of the National Bolivarian Armed Forces of Venezuela.

The Venezuelan Navy serves the purpose of defending the naval sovereignty of Venezuela, including inland and fluvial security, and it also serves to prevent illegal activities on Venezuela's borders and collaborates with international organizations to safeguard international waters from criminal activities.

History
The Venezuelan Navy was born as a coastal defense force during the beginning of the Venezuelan War of Independence. In May 1810, Commander Lino de Clemente, a veteran officer of the Spanish Navy who joined the April 1810 coup against the colonial government, was appointed the first Minister of Defense of the republic and began the long building of the armed forces including the formation of the navy. In April 1811 the Nautical School, with Ensign Vicente Parrado as its first superintendent, was opened by order of the national government in La Guaira to train future naval officers, months before the Venezuelan Declaration of Independence, thus the Navy's origins start from this date, with its first vessels being those formerly used by the naval forces of the Captaincy General of Venezuela, and participated in its first actions in the campaigns in Guayana in 1811-12, the baptism of fire for the fledgling naval service. Colonel Antonio Mendoza from the Venezuelan Army was its first commanding general.

For a long time their vessels, even if obsolete, were maintained properly by its sailors.

Joint exercises

In September 2008, the Russian Navy's nuclear-powered missile cruiser Pyotr Velikiy, accompanied by three other ships of Russia's Northern Fleet, sailed from its base in Severomorsk on a cruise to the Caribbean Sea for a joint exercise with the Venezuelan Navy. This action represented the first major Russian power projection in that region since the end of the Cold War. The fleet of ships, headed by the nuclear-powered Pyotr Velikiy, set off from its base at Severomorsk in the Arctic on 22 September. Russian Navy spokesman Igor Dygalo told the AFP news agency, "It's the nuclear-powered guided missile cruiser Peter the Great, the anti-submarine warship Admiral Chebanenko and other accompanying ships". The other ships included a tug boat and supply ships.

Crisis in Venezuela 

During the crisis in Venezuela, the Venezuelan Navy became engaged in the conflict when it began to prevent the entry of humanitarian aid into the country. A ship departing from Puerto Rico attempted to ship aid into the Venezuelan port city of Puerto Cabello. Six vessels of the Venezuelan Navy, including the Mariscal Sucre-class frigate Almirante Brion and patrol boats, were deployed to prevent the entry of the aid shipment. The ship, carrying civilians, returned to Puerto Rico after the Venezuelan Navy threatened to "open fire" on the humanitarian ship. Governor of Puerto Rico Ricardo Rossello, who ordered the return of the ship, stated that the act by the Venezuelan Navy was "unacceptable and shameful" and that Puerto Rico "notified our partners in the U.S. government about this serious incident".

On 30 March 2020, the Venezuelan patrol boat Naiguatá sank after being rammed by the polar ice class cruise liner , while in international waters. According to RCGS Resolutes owner, the Coast Guard ship had fired shots and ordered the cruise ship to follow it to Margarita Island, a Venezuelan harbour.  Naiguatá sank following the ramming, with RCGS Resolute informing the international Maritime Rescue Coordination Centre (MRCC) of the incident and offering assistance. After staying in the area for an hour, RCGS Resolute was informed through MRCC that assistance was not required as Naiguatás crew had been rescued by the Venezuelan Navy.

Organization of the Navy
As of 2016, Admiral Orlando Miguel Maneiro Gaspar is the Commanding General of the National Navy.

Naval Operations Command
The Naval Operations Command is commanded by the Chief of Naval Operations, currently Vice Admiral Antonio Díaz Clemente. This command is aimed towards the defense of the territorial maritime and inland waters and the coastline of the nation, and by extension into its ground and air territories.

Venezuelan Naval Aviation Command
The command serves as the air arm of the Venezuelan Navy, with responsibility for air operations and transport for the entire Navy.

Coast Guard Command
Headquartered in La Guaira, Vargas, it is responsible for the surveillance of Venezuelas jurisdictional waters.

Current ships

Fleet forces and Coast Guard ship organization

Light frigates 

 Two /Mariscal Sucre-class missile frigates class
 F-21 Mariscal Sucre, in service 1980
 F-22 Almirante Brion, in service 1981

Offshore patrol vessels 

One ship, PC-22 Warao is out of service. It was taken to Fortaleza, Brazil following a grounding incident in 2012, and subsequently to Rio de Janeiro.
 PC-21 Guaiquerí, in service

One ship, GC-23 , was sunk after it rammed a cruise ship in 2020.
 GC-21 Guaicamacuto, in service
 GC-22 Yavire, in service
 GC-24 Tamanaco, in service

Amphibious and service ships 

 Four Capana-class LST.
 T-61 Capana, into service 1983, .
 T-64 Los Llanos, into service 1983, .
 Four Los Frailes-class LST 
 One Ciudad Bolívar-class supply ship.
 T-81 Ciudad Bolívar, in service since 09-23-2001
 One Bricbarc type/Simón Bolívar training sailboat.
 BE-11 Simón Bolívar, in service since 08-6-1980
 One Almirante Francisco de Miranda-class tugboat
 RA-11 Almirante Francisco de Miranda, in service since 28-03-2007

Coast guard ships 

 Four USCG Point-class patrol boats, .
 16 Gavion-class patrol boats.
 Damen Stan 2606 vessels, built in Venezuela, similar to the United States Coast Guard's , . One already in service, 1 completed, 5 more to be built

Naval aviation assets

Airplanes 

Note: The Navy has others two or three light aircraft.

Helicopters

List of Commanders of the Navy

Naval ranks

Professional and enlisted

Officers

See also
Venezuelan Marine Corps

References

External links
  Sitio oficial del Ministerio del Poder Popular para la Defensa de Venezuela
  Sitio oficial de la Armada Bolivariana de Venezuela
 Venezuela Naval Forces (Fuerzas Navales or Armada)